Yare Prison (officially: Prison of San Francisco de Yare) is a prison in San Francisco de Yare, in the Simón Bolívar Municipality  of the Miranda state, Venezuela. Like other prisons in Venezuela, it is known for its harsh conditions, mainly due to overcrowding and poor facilities. Nationally some 44,500 prisoners are housed in buildings designed for 15,000.

There are three groups of buildings: Yare I, II, and III. These centres are overpopulated. Yare I was designed to have 750 prisoners, but currently has about 1153. Yare I was built in 1984; and Yare II between 1997 and 1998. The principal military involved in the coup of February 1992 against President Carlos Andrés Pérez were imprisoned here from 1992 until 1994, until President Rafael Caldera's pardon. While imprisoned here, Hugo Chávez, leader of the coup, wrote his manifesto "Cómo salir del laberinto".

2012 Riot 

On the 20th of August, 2012, a clash between two gangs in Yare I caused 25 deaths and 43 wounded. The cause of the brawl was a gun discharged during discussion between the gang leaders. However, the shot did not hit anyone.

See also 
 Yare prison riot

References 

Prisons in Venezuela
Hugo Chávez
Miranda (state)
1984 establishments in Venezuela